Alfred Delcourt (17 January 1929 – 12 December 2012) was a Belgian football referee.

Refereeing career
In 1965, Delcourt was promoted to officiate in the Belgian First Division A, the top flight of Belgian football. Two years later, he was appointed as a FIFA referee.

In 1976, Delcourt was appointed as a referee for UEFA Euro 1976, where he officiated a semi-final match between Yugoslavia and West Germany.

Delcourt retired from refereeing in 1978.

References

External links
 
 
 

1929 births
2012 deaths
People from Evergem
Belgian football referees
UEFA Euro 1976 referees